Emily Frances Alice Arbuthnott (born 3 October 1997 Kingston upon Thames) is a British professional tennis player.

Arbuthnott has been ranked as high as world No. 551 in singles and No. 319 in doubles by the WTA.

At the 2017 Summer Universiade held in Taipei, Taiwan, she won the bronze medal in women's doubles, along with Olivia Nicholls.

At the 2019 Summer Universiade held in Naples, Italy, she won the silver medal in women's singles.

She plays for the Stanford University tennis team. Born in Kingston upon Thames, England, Emily's parents are James and Sally, she has two brothers, Bertie and Freddie, and her aunt Joanna Copley played lacrosse for England.

ITF Circuit finals

Singles: 4 (2 titles, 2 runner–ups)

Doubles: 20 (14 titles, 6 runner–ups)

References

External links
 
 

1997 births
Living people
British female tennis players
English female tennis players
Universiade medalists in tennis
Universiade silver medalists for Great Britain
Universiade bronze medalists for Great Britain
Medalists at the 2017 Summer Universiade
Medalists at the 2019 Summer Universiade
Stanford Cardinal women's tennis players
Stanford University alumni
21st-century British women